The Last of the Mohicans is a 1936 American Western film based on the 1826 novel The Last of the Mohicans by James Fenimore Cooper. It was directed by George B. Seitz and stars Randolph Scott, Binnie Barnes and Henry Wilcoxon.

Plot
During the French and Indian War, Alice and Cora, the two daughters of Colonel Munro, commander of a British fort, set out from Albany to join their father. They are escorted by Major Duncan Heyward, who has loved Alice for a long time, and by the Huron Indian Magua. Magua is secretly an enemy of the British. Magua betrays them, but they are rescued by a colonial scout named Hawkeye and his friends, the last two members of the Mohican tribe, Chingachgook and his son Uncas. On their way to the fort, Uncas falls in love with Cora, while Hawkeye and Alice are attracted to each other.

The fort is besieged by the French, under General Montcalm, and their Indian allies. Hawkeye sneaks out at night and overhears Magua's treacherous plans to raid the unprotected colonial settlements. Colonel Munro refuses to accept Hawkeye's unsupported word, and forbids the colonials to leave to protect their loved ones. Hawkeye arranges for the men to depart, but remains behind. Munro has no choice but to pronounce a death sentence on him for his actions. Magua incites his men to attack the fort to forestall an agreement between Montcalm and Munro that would allow the British to surrender the fort peacefully in exchange for their lives. Before Montcalm can stop the fighting, Munro is fatally wounded and his daughters are carried off by Magua and a small band of his supporters. Magua tells the women that Cora will become his squaw, and Alice will be burned alive.

Hawkeye and his friends break out of the stockade and set out in pursuit, as does Heyward. When they reach a stream, they are forced to split up. Hawkeye and Chingachgook search downstream, Heyward and Uncas upstream. Uncas picks up the trail and, unwilling to wait for the others, hurries ahead by himself. He manages to free Cora, but they are trapped on top of a cliff. Uncas kills one man, but Magua sends him plummeting to the bottom of the cliff. Rather than become Magua's woman, Cora chooses to jump to her death. The dying Uncas drags himself over to her lifeless body and takes her hand in his before succumbing. Chingachgook arrives and challenges Magua to fight one-on-one. Hawkeye prevents Heyward from interfering. Chingachgook drowns Magua in the river.

Meanwhile, Alice is taken to a large enemy settlement to be burned at the stake. Hawkeye sends Chingachgook to stand guard, then tells Heyward he will offer himself in exchange for Alice. Heyward offers his life instead, but Hawkeye tells him that the Indians would not trade Alice for a British officer they do not know. It must be an enemy warrior they respect highly, and Hawkeye meets that description. Heyward knocks out Hawkeye and takes his clothes, because the enemy does not know what Hawkeye looks like. Heyward enters the armed camp and bargains for Alice's release. Hawkeye awakens and follows him. Faced with two men claiming to be Hawkeye, the enemy chief decides the winner of a shooting contest must be the real one, and he is proved right. Before she leaves, Alice kisses Hawkeye. Then he is tied to a stake and the wood around him set on fire. Alice and the others encounter a British relief force led by General Abercrombie. They storm the camp and free Hawkeye.

Hawkeye faces a court-martial, but Heyward has the charges dismissed. Hawkeye enlists in the British Army and sets out with them to attack Canada. Alice tells him she will be waiting for him at Albany.

Cast
 Randolph Scott as Hawkeye
 Binnie Barnes as Alice Munro
 Henry Wilcoxon as Major Duncan Heyward
 Bruce Cabot as Magua
 Heather Angel as Cora Munro 
 Phillip Reed as Uncas
 Robert Barrat as Chingachgook
 Hugh Buckler as Colonel Munro
 Willard Robertson as Captain Winthrop
 William Stack as General Montcalm
 Lumsden Hare as General Abercrombie
 Frank McGlynn Sr. as Gamut
 Will Stanton as Jenkins
 William V. Mong as Sacham
 Art Dupuis as De Levis
 Ian MacLaren as William Pitt
 Reginald Barlow as Duke of Newcastle
 Olaf Hytten as King George II
 Lionel Belmore as Patroon
 Claude King as Duke of Marlborough
 Harry Cording as Trapper (uncredited) 
 Ethan Laidlaw as Colonialist (uncredited)

Production
The movie was the last of several producer Edward Small's Reliance Picture Corporation made for United Artists. Merle Oberon was originally announced as the female lead. There were plans to make the movie in colour but Small decided it was too expensive.

Philip Dunne worked on the script with John L. Balderston. Dunne later claimed that the final film:
Is only a pallid ghost of what John and I originally wrote. Ours was a full-blooded screenplay, combining adventure and excitement with what we considered some respectable poetry in the love story between the patrician English girl and the young Mohican brave. Above all we painted an authentic picture of colonial American in the eighteenth century.
Dunne said that production of the film was postponed due to casting problems; he and Balderstone went away and by the time they came back shooting had started.
The film was appalling. In our absence, Eddie apparently had succumbed to the itch many producers have to tamper with inactive scripts. I don't know what writers he had hired, but they had succeeded in turning our authentic eighteenth century period piece into a third-rate Western. The characters even spoke to each other in twentieth century colloquialisms, and each had been rendered banal beyond belief.
Small then hired Dunne to rewrite the dialogue on set, although he says the structure of his original script remained altered.

Filming locations
 Big Bear Lake, Big Bear Valley, San Bernardino National Forest, California, USA 
 Cedar Lake, Big Bear Valley, San Bernardino National Forest, California, USA 
 Smith River, near the community of Hiouchi, Del Norte County, California, USA
 Iverson Ranch, 1 Iverson Lane, Chatsworth, Los Angeles, California, USA 
 Kern River, Bakersfield, California, USA 
 Lake Earl, near Crescent City, Del Norte County, California, USA
 Lake Sherwood, California, USA 
 RKO-Pathé Studios – 9336 Washington Blvd., Culver City, California, USA (studio)
 San Bernardino National Forest, California, USA

Reception
In his review for AllMovie, Paul Brenner wrote that Randolph Scott had "one of his best roles as Hawkeye in this exciting film adaptation of James Fenimore Cooper's often filmed novel." Clem Beauchamp was nominated for the Academy Award for Best Assistant Director.

Influence on future adaptations 
The film served as the basis for a subsequent 1992 adaptation written and directed by Michael Mann and starring Daniel Day-Lewis as Hawkeye, Madeleine Stowe as Cora, Wes Studi as Magua, Russell Means as Chingachgook, and Steven Waddington as Duncan. Writers John L. Balderston, Daniel Moore, and Paul Perez were given a "Story by" credit on the film, which carries over several changes made in the 1936 film. These include Hawkeye's characterisation as a younger, romantic lead who develops a relationship with Cora after she rejects the proposal of Duncan.

References

External links
 
 
 
 
 

1936 Western (genre) films
1936 films
American black-and-white films
Films based on The Last of the Mohicans
Films directed by George B. Seitz
Films with screenplays by Philip Dunne
Films produced by Edward Small
American Western (genre) films
Films shot in Big Bear Lake, California
1930s English-language films
1930s American films
Films with screenplays by John L. Balderston